Vincent Joseph Pasquantino (born October 10, 1997) is an American professional baseball first baseman for the Kansas City Royals of Major League Baseball (MLB). He made his MLB debut in 2022.

Amateur career
Pasquantino attended James River High School in Midlothian, Virginia. He enrolled at Old Dominion University and played college baseball for the Old Dominion Monarchs. In 2018, he played collegiate summer baseball with the Hyannis Harbor Hawks of the Cape Cod Baseball League. He was selected by the Kansas City Royals in the 11th round of the 2019 Major League Baseball draft.

Professional career
Pasquantino made his professional debut with the Burlington Royals, batting .294 with 14 home runs and 53 runs batted in (RBIs) over 57 games. He did not play in 2020 because the season was cancelled due to the COVID-19 pandemic. He started the 2021 season with the Quad Cities River Bandits before being promoted to the Northwest Arkansas Naturals. Over 116 games between the two teams, he slashed .300/.394/.563 with 24 home runs, 84 RBIs, and 37 doubles.

Pasquantino opened the 2022 season with the Omaha Storm Chasers. After the Royals traded first baseman Carlos Santana on June 27, the Royals promoted Pasquantino to the major leagues to take his place on the active roster.
 He was named the American League player of the week for August 8 to 14 when he hit .455 with four home runs and six RBIs in six games.

Pasquantino is on the Italy national baseball team roster for the 2023 World Baseball Classic.

References

External links

Living people
1997 births
Baseball players from Richmond, Virginia
Burlington Royals players
Hyannis Harbor Hawks players
Kansas City Royals players
Major League Baseball first basemen
Northwest Arkansas Naturals players
Old Dominion Monarchs baseball players
Omaha Storm Chasers players
Quad Cities River Bandits players
Tigres del Licey players
2023 World Baseball Classic players